Peserai (also known as Mukim 3) is a mukim (administrative division) in the district of Batu Pahat in the Johor State of Malaysia.

Administration 
Peserai, which has five villages,  constitutes one of the 14 mukims in the Batu Pahat district. The administration of the mukim is headed by a chieftain.

External links 
 Pejabat Daerah Batu Pahat
 Pecahan daerah Batu Pahat

Mukims of Batu Pahat District